Arrissoules is a village in the district of Yverdon of the Canton of Vaud, Switzerland.

The village was an independent municipality until it was incorporated into Rovray on January 1, 2005.

The Arrissoules Tunnel of the A1 motorway is located near the village.

Villages in the canton of Vaud
Former municipalities of the canton of Vaud